The Sea Dragon Heir is a fantasy novel written by Storm Constantine, first published in 1999.

Plot 
The plot centers on a royal family, long tainted by a curse put upon them by the emperor many hundreds of years before. The son of every Palindrake (literally meaning Water Dragon) king was named Valraven; according to the traditional mythology, any woman that he took to wife would immediately become the Sea Wife, a being who could capture and hold the dragon daughters within herself. The emperor tries twice, once unsuccessfully and once successfully, to awaken the dragon queen and her daughters.

Part One
The novel starts with Pharinet describing her life as a young girl, playing in the gardens with her best friends Ellony and Khaster, and thinking about her brother's future.

Part Two
Valraven and Pharinet engage in twincest, leaving Pharinet pregnant with her brother's child. Valraven attends a military academy where he meets a brash and sexually extrovert young man. Pharinet visits a soothsayer who predicts the miscarriage of her child. The prediction is realised a few days after she leaves.

Part Three
Valraven returns with his lover, who takes an interest in Pharinet, culminating in them having sex. He empties his seed into her saying, "Now I have been in both of you." Ellony is possessed by the Sea Dragon's singing, so allured by the melody that she runs into the sea and drowns.

Characters 
Valraven: The Sea Dragon Heir. His military nature could perhaps explain his aloofness and incapacity to show emotion. On the other hand the "accident" on the beach could explain the change in his personality.
Pharinet: Valraven's twin sister. The two share an incestuous relationship in Part One. However the death of Ellony marks a significant change in his attitude towards Pharinet.
Ellony: The first Sea Wife. Ellony was Pharinet's best friend when they were younger, but when Ellony was betrothed to Valraven and pronounced just how much she loved Pharinet's brother, whose heart was already taken by herself, she began to hate Ellony. Ellony did not really know this and she believed that she was still Pharinet's best friend, even after her own wedding. She died during the "accident" though, taken into the sea by the Dragon Queen's daughters.
Khaster: Ellony's brother. Khaster married Pharinet at the same time as Ellony married Valraven, and he also joined the military like Valraven.

1999 British novels
British fantasy novels